The Chicago and North Western Depot in Watertown, Wisconsin, United States, is a railroad depot built in 1903 and operated by the Chicago and North Western Railway. The station served passengers from 1903 to June 1950. Afterward, it serviced freight trains until 1976. It has since been converted into a florist shop. The Union Pacific Railroad's single-tracked Clyman Subdivision remains in front of the depot.

The building was listed on the National Register of Historic Places in 1979 and on the State Register of Historic Places in 1989.

References 

Railway stations on the National Register of Historic Places in Wisconsin
Commercial buildings on the National Register of Historic Places in Wisconsin
National Register of Historic Places in Jefferson County, Wisconsin
Watertown
Former railway stations in Wisconsin
Flower markets
Charles Sumner Frost buildings
Victorian architecture in Wisconsin
Railway stations in the United States opened in 1903